An outdoor 1981 bronze sculpture depicting George H. Hermann by Lonnie Edwards is installed in Houston's Hermann Park, in the U.S. state of Texas. The statue, which stands on a pink granite pedestal, was donated by the Hermann Hospital Board of Trustees.

See also

 List of public art in Houston

References

1981 establishments in Texas
1981 sculptures
Bronze sculptures in Texas
Hermann Park
Monuments and memorials in Texas
Outdoor sculptures in Houston
Sculptures of men in Texas
Statues in Texas